Olav Eldøy (born 1 November 1948) is a Norwegian furniture designer.

Eldøy was born in 1948 on Stord, Norway. He was educated the National College of Art & Design in Bergen 1973. Some of his award winning products are: the chair Peel, the chair Date & the chair Eight produced by the Norwegian furniture manufacture Variér.

Awards 
2008- The Norwegian Design Council's mark of Good Design for the chair "EIGHT"
2004- Furniture of the year in Norway – Sofa Vatne 116 – Elle Decoration International Design Awards
2003- Best Design product, Salon deu Meuble, Paris for the chairs "Peel"
2003- The Norwegian Design Council's mark of Good Design for the chair "Date", nominated for the Award of Honour.
2002- The Norwegian Design Council's mark of Good Design for the chair "Peel", nominated for the Award of Honour.
2001- The Norwegian Design Council's mark of Good Design for the chair "REX"
2000- The Norwegian Design Council's mark of Good Design for the sofa "Europa"
1997- The Norwegian Design Council's mark of Good Design for the concept "Woody Shop"
1997- The Norwegian Design Council's mark of Good Design Design for sofa "Cox," manufactured by Fora form as
1995- Second prize in the Norwegian competition 'Wood without limits', "Theme 1: "Home furniture in Norwegian hard wood with knots" for the chair H&H"
1991- The NOR IN prize for sofa uStreamline, manufactured by Vatne Møbler as, Vatne
1986- The Norwegian Design Council's mark of Good Design for the furniture serie "Formula" in partnership with Steinar Hindenes

Exhibitions 
2008 “DesignER” - USF, Bergen
2007 "Norwegian chairs" - Travelling exhibition Oslo, Berlin, Wien, Stockholm
2006 "100% Norway in London"
2005 "Northern Lights" - Ozon Living Design Centre, Tokyo
2005 "100% Norway in London"
2004 "Design tur/retur" - Norsk Form, Oslo
2004 "Sofa med hatt, penn og kol" - Stord Kunstlag, Stord
2004 "Stol på klær" - Norsk Form, Oslo
2003-05 "Design from the Coolest Corner" - Travelling exhibition, Berlin
2003 "En reise i Norsk møbeldesign" - Jugendstilsenteret, Ålesund
2003 "Furniture exhibition" - Norsk Møbelfaglig Senter, Sykkylven
2002 "Sofa med hatt" - Kunsthåndverkerne i Kongensgate, Oslo
2002 "Sofa con sombrero en Espana", L'Alfàs del Pi, Spain
2002 "Form 2002" – Designers autumn exhibition, Norsk Form, Oslo
2001 "Källemo på Hylteberga" - Scandinavien Art, furniture and photography exhibition, Sweden
2001 "Blest" - Vestlandske Kunstindustrimuseum, Bergen
2000 "Skogsutstilling" - Norsk Skogbruksforening, Elverum
2000 "Sofa med hatt i Ål" - Ål Kunstforening, Ål
2000 "Sofa med hatt", Moster Amfi, Bømlo
2000 "Form 2000" - Designers autumn exhibition, Norsk Form, Oslo
1999 "Empty spaces" - Norwegian design exhibition / IFI, Sydney
1999 "Design Sydney 99" Norwegian design exhibition, Sydney
1998 “Børs & Kaviar", Sandvigske Samlinger, Maihaugen, Lillehammer
1998 "Sven Lunds Øga" - Scandinavian travelling exhibition
1997 'Arenum Designer Show', Bergen
1997 'Waves Norwegian Furniture Design' - International travelling exhibition
1997 "Design Nordic Way" - Scandinavian travelling exhibition
1996 'Arenum Designer Show', Bergen
1996 "Form 96" - Designers' autumn exhibition, Norsk Form, Oslo
1996 "Design Made in Norway" - Japan Industrial Design Promotion, Tokyo
1996 "Contrasts Åke Axelson and Olav Eldøy, furniture designers" - Norsk Form, Oslo
1996 "MIL Design stand" (Norwegian Furnishings Manufacturers Association) Represented Norwegian Furnishings Manufacturers Association at Scandinavian Furniture Fair, Bella Center, Copenhagen
1995 'Møbeldesigneren Olav Eldøy" - Exhibition at Sykkylven Center of Norwegian Furniture Profession
 1992 "Sofa med hatt i fengsel" - Exhibition in the old prison at Stord
 1990 "Sitt i nitti" - 90 Norwegian chairs. Exhibition in the Sandvigske Collections, Maihaugen
1988 "Norsk Form 88" - Challenger exhibition, Federation of Norwegian Design
1987 "Som det ser ut" - Design from Sunnhordland, Stord Kunstlag
1984/85 "Interior NÅ " - Furniture exhibition shown in the Museum of Applied Arts in Trondheim, Oslo, Bergen and Stranda

References 
 http://www.architonic.com/cat/8103837/1
 http://www.norskdesign.no/furniture-design/stokke-date-chair-article1140-408.html
 http://www.norskdesign.no/furniture-design/stokke-peel-article822-408.html
 http://www.norskdesign.no/furniture-design/varier-eight-high-kitchen-stool-bar-stool-article7878-408.html
 http://www.eldoy.no
 http://www.bt.no/forbruker/article515503.ece
 http://www.treehugger.com/files/2004/11/peel_chair.php
 http://www.kunstforalle.no/redaksjonelt.asp?meny=6,173,310&act=read&RecNo=1773
 http://www.scandinaviandesign.com/stokke/0201.htm

Norwegian furniture designers
Living people
1948 births